Events from the 3rd century in Roman Britain.

Events
 206
 Governor Lucius Alfenus Senecio repairs Hadrian's Wall and appeals for help from the Emperor against the northern tribes.
 208
 Emperor Septimius Severus and his son Caracalla take personal command of the army in Britain.
 209
 Severus and Caracalla lead an expedition against the Caledonii, and build forts at Cramond and the Tay estuary.
 210
 Caracalla leads an expedition against the rebellious Maeatae tribe.
 211
 4 February – Severus dies at York, while preparing another expedition against the northern rebels.
 Caracalla, now Emperor, abandons territory north of Hadrian's Wall, and returns to Rome.
 c. 214
 Britain divided into two provinces, Britannia Superior and Britannia Inferior, with administrative centres at London and York respectively.
 c. 220
 Saxons raid south-east coast; forts built at Reculver and Branodunum (Brancaster).
 245
 Many thousands of acres of modern-day Lincolnshire are inundated by a great flood.
 255
 Work begins on a riverside wall in London.
 259
 Rebel leader Latinus Postumus proclaims Britain as part of his "Empire of the Gauls".
 270
 Construction of forts along the Saxon Shore begins in response to increased raiding.
 273
 Stone walls built around St Albans.
 274
 Postumus's Gallic Empire is reabsorbed into the Roman Empire under Aurelian.
 277
 Imperial edict lifts restrictions on British wine production.
 General Victorinus puts down revolt, and settles Burgundian and Vandal prisoners in Britain.
Britannic Empire 286-296
287
 Mausaeus Carausius takes power in Britain and proclaims himself Emperor.
 289
 Carausius defeats Emperor Maximian in a naval battle.
 293
 Finance minister Allectus murders Carausius and seizes power; employs Frankish mercenaries.
 296
 Julius Constantius defeats Britons near Silchester, killing Allectus; prevents retreating Franks from sacking London.
 297
 Re-building of forts near Hadrian's Wall begins.
 Constantius returns to Gaul.
 First mention on record of the Picts attacking from the north in Eumenius' Panegyrici Latini.

References

See also
End of Roman rule in Britain

 
British history timelines
Britain
 
Centuries in Roman Britain